The 2005 regular session of the 148th Georgia General Assembly met from January 10, 2005, to March 31, 2005, at which time both houses adjourned sine die.  In addition, Governor Sonny Perdue called for a special session, which met from September 6, 2005, to September 10, 2005. This was the first session since Reconstruction that both houses were controlled by Republicans, as the House of Representatives was won by the GOP at the 2004 election. The legislature redrew legislative and congressional maps in 2005 after federal judges struck down both maps which were drawn by the 146th legislature as violating the one person, one vote guarantee of the U.S. Constitution, resulting in a reshuffling of districts which took effect in the next legislature which shored up Republican gains in both chambers and in Congress.

The 2006 regular session of the 148th General Assembly met from January 9, 2006, to March 30, 2006, at which time both houses adjourned sine die.

Party standings

Senate

House of Representatives 

*Active political parties in Georgia are not limited to the Democratic and Republican parties.  Libertarians, Greens, the Southern Party of Georgia, and others, run candidates in numerous elections.  However, for the 2005-06 session of the General Assembly, only one legislator was not from the two major parties, and he did not run as a member of any other party.

Officers

Senate

Presiding Officer

Majority leadership

Minority leadership

House of Representatives

Presiding Officer

Majority leadership

Minority leadership

Members of the Georgia State Senate, 2005-2006

Members of the Georgia State House of Representatives, 2005–2006 

  Henry Howard died in office of a heart attack on October 3, 2005.  A special election was held on November 8, 2005, to fill the seat, which was won by Rep. Howard's widow, Earnestine Howard.  She was sworn in on November 17, 2005, and will serve out the remainder of her late husband's term of office.

Notable Legislation

2005 general session

Voting 

House Bill 244  requires voters to provide photographic identification at polling locations in order to vote and makes voting by absentee ballot easier, and also reinstituted the majority vote and runoffs for primaries and general elections which were abolished by the Democratic-majority General Assembly in 1995. Amid great controversy, the law was signed by Governor Perdue on April 22, 2005.  Although the law received preclearance from the Department of Justice under the provisions of the Voting Rights Act, the law was later ruled unconstitutional by a court in Rome, Georgia.  The current status of the law remains uncertain.

2006 general session

Voting 

Senate Bill 84, like H.B. 244, requires photographic identification at poll locations to vote.  To address some of the concerns raised by the court ruling against H.B. 244, S.B. 84 has more extensive provisions for assisting those without photographic identification to obtain acceptable identification.  The bill was passed by both chambers and signed by Governor Perdue on January 26, 2006.  Like H.B. 244, S.B. 84 received preclearance from the Justice Department, although it is currently being challenged in court.

Eminent domain 

House Bill 1313 , which would restrict the uses for which private property can be taken via eminent domain, passed both the House and the Senate with no "no" votes.  The bill is expected to be signed by Governor Perdue.

House Resolution 1306  would amend the state constitution by replacing language allowing broad freedom to apply eminent domain with more restrictive language providing for additional restrictions as specified by laws such as H.B. 1313.  The resolution passed the House and the Senate and was signed by Governor Perdue, and the question of its final adoption will be put to Georgia voters in the November election.

Immigration 
Senate Bill 529  was strongly advocated by Senator Chip Rodgers and requires beneficiaries of many state services to provide proof of residency.  Most Democrats voted against the legislation, but it nevertheless passed the House and Senate and was signed into law by Governor Perdue on April 17, 2006.

References

Georgia General Assembly 2005-2006 Legislative Session
2005-2006 Representatives by Name
2005-2006 Senators by District

Georgia (U.S. state) legislative sessions
2005 in American politics
2006 in American politics
2005 in Georgia (U.S. state)
2006 in Georgia (U.S. state)